This is a list of Turkish diplomats and other officials assassinated by Armenian militant organisations. The Armenian Secret Army for the Liberation of Armenia (ASALA) and Justice Commandos of the Armenian Genocide (JCAG) were radical Armenian nationalist groups that carried out a series of attacks and assassinations of Turkish diplomats and other officials in the 1970s and 1980s. The groups were formed in response to the mass killings of Armenians in Ottoman Turkey during World War I, which many historians consider to be a genocide. ASALA and JCAG targeted Turkish diplomats and officials in Europe, the Middle East, and North America in a series of bombings, shootings, and other attacks. The group aimed to draw international attention to the Armenian genocide and to pressure Turkey to acknowledge the killings as a genocide. The ASALA and JCAG attacks resulted in the deaths of dozens of people, including Turkish diplomats, embassy staff, and bystanders, and injured many more. The group's actions were widely condemned by the international community including the Reagan administration that labelled the assassinations as terrorism. In the following years, the international community's response led to a wave of arrests and extraditions of ASALA members. The ASALA and JCAG attacks and the issue of the Armenian genocide remain highly sensitive and controversial topics in Turkey, and discussions of the events are often met with strong emotions and heated political debates. Despite this, the attacks serve as a reminder of the ongoing tensions and historical wounds that continue to affect Armenian-Turkish relations to this day.

1970s

1980s

Further reading 
 

  p. 161

 , p. 27

 "Armenian Aggression Against Azerbaijan". 

 , p. 71

 "Das Armenier-Problem, Behauptungen – Tatsachen".

 , p 39

 , p. 256

  p. 151.

See also
 Turkish consulate attack in Paris
 Esenboğa Airport attack
 1983 Orly Airport attack
 List of attacks by ASALA
 List of attacks by JCAG

References

Lists of victims of crimes
Armenian Secret Army for the Liberation of Armenia
Armenian militant organisations
Assassinated by Armenian militant organisations
Justice Commandos of the Armenian Genocide
Terrorist attacks attributed to Armenian militant groups
Lists of assassinations
Turkish diplomats assassinated by Armenian militant organisations
Turkish diplomats assassinated by Armenian militant organisations